Raupach is a German surname. People with the name include:

Ernst Raupach (1784–1852), German playwright
Hermann Raupach (1728–1778), German composer
Hilde Raupach, German luger, 1928 European championships Gold Medal winner
Michael Raupach (1950–2015), Australian climate scientist

See also
 

German-language surnames